Corwin Township is located in Logan County, Illinois. As of the 2010 census, its population was 643 and it contained 302 housing units. Corwin Township changed its name from Middletown Township on an unknown date.

Geography

Demographics

References

External links
US Census
City-data.com
Illinois State Archives

Townships in Logan County, Illinois
Townships in Illinois